Hodobana Cave is a cave or karst located in Romania. The Hodobana cave is described as the third largest in Romania. Hodobana Cave is believed to be more than 22,000 metres deep.

References 

Caves of Romania